The 2015 P&G U.S. National Gymnastics Championships was the 52nd edition of the U.S. National Gymnastics Championships. The competition was held from August 13–16, 2015 at the Bankers Life Fieldhouse in Indianapolis, Indiana. It was the fourth time the competition has been held in the city.

Event information 
The fifty-second edition of the Championships, the competition was held at the Bankers Life Fieldhouse in Downtown Indianapolis, Indiana; the home arena of the Indiana Pacers. This was the fourth time the competition has been in the city; the last time being in 2005. However, the National governing body, USA Gymnastics, is headquartered in the city.

Competition schedule 
The competition featured Senior and Junior competitions for both women's and men's disciplines. The competition was as follows;

Thursday, August 13

1:00 pm – Jr. Women's Competition – Day 1
7:00 pm – Sr. Women's Competition – Day 1

Friday, August 14

1:00 pm – Jr. Men's Competition – Day 1
7:00 pm – Sr. Men's Competition – Day 1

Saturday, August 15

1:00 pm – Jr. Women's Competition – Final Day
7:30 pm – Sr. Women's Competition – Final Day

Sunday, August 16

1:30 pm – Sr. Men's Competition – Final Day
7:30 pm – Jr. Men's Competition – Final Day

Note: all times are in Eastern Time Zone.

Sponsorship 
Procter & Gamble, a multinational consumer goods company, was the title sponsor of the event; as part of the a deal the company signed with USA Gymnastics from 2013–16. The competition was also presented by CoverGirl and Gilette. In addition, Vera Bradley, Deloitte, Kroger, OneAmerica, Faegre Baker Daniels and Washington National were all sponsoring the event.

Medalists

Participants

References 

U.S. National Gymnastics Championships
Gymnastics in Indiana
Sports competitions in Indiana
U.S. Open
U.S. Open
U.S. Open
2010s in Indianapolis